The 2014 FIA European Hill Climb Championship was the fifty-eighth edition of the FIA European Hill Climb Championship. The season consisted of twelve rounds, commencing on 11 April in France and ending on 21 September in Croatia.

In Category 1, the championship was won by Macedonian driver Igor Stefanovski, for his first European title. Stefanovski won 8 of the 12 events to be held during the season, ultimately finishing 48.5 points clear of his closest rival Jaromír Malý. Another Czech driver, Jiří Los, finished in third place in the class championship, a further 18.5 points behind Malý; Los was the only championship regular to take a victory off Stefanovski, achieving his win at the Ecce Homo Šternberk on home soil. The remaining class victories were taken by António Nogueira at the Rampa Internacional da Falperra, Peter Jureňa at the Dobšinsky Kopec and the defending class champion, Tomislav Muhvić, on home soil at the final round, the Buzetski Dani. In Category 2, Simone Faggioli dominated the class, winning his sixth consecutive European title by going undefeated during the season; he won all 12 events to be held, of which 10 counted towards the championship standings. Thus, Faggioli finished 57.5 points clear of his nearest rival, compatriot Fausto Bormolini, while Dan Michl finished a further 31.5 points behind in third place.

Calendar

Event results

See also

 FIA International Hill Climb Cup
 Hillclimbing
 Mont Ventoux Hill Climb

References

External links
 www.cem-ehc.com/ European Hill Climb Championship website
 www.dovrchu.cz - website about Czech and European hill climbs
 www.euromontagna.com - Most complete European Hill Climb Championship race results 1957-today by ing. Roman Krejčí

Hillclimbing series
Hill Climb Championship
European Hill Climb Championship